Brachychilus is a genus of longhorn beetles of the subfamily Lamiinae, containing the following species:

 Brachychilus chevrolatii Thomson, 1868
 Brachychilus literatus Blanchard in Gay, 1851
 Brachychilus scutellaris Blanchard in Gay, 1851
 Brachychilus wagenknechti Cerda, 1954

References

Phacellini
Cerambycidae genera